Electrostrymon angelia, the fulvous hairstreak, is a species of hairstreak in the butterfly family Lycaenidae. It is found in North America.

The MONA or Hodges number for Electrostrymon angelia is 4352.

Subspecies
These four subspecies belong to the species Electrostrymon angelia:
 Electrostrymon angelia angelia (Hewitson, 1874)
 Electrostrymon angelia boyeri (Comstock & Huntington, 1943)
 Electrostrymon angelia dowi
 Electrostrymon angelia karukera Brévignon, 2000

References

Further reading

External links

 

Eumaeini
Articles created by Qbugbot
Butterflies described in 1874